"Between the Sheets" is a quiet storm-funk song released by American band The Isley Brothers in 1983 off their album of the same name on the T-Neck imprint.

Covers
Jazz band Fourplay recorded a hit cover version of the song in 1992 with Chaka Khan as the vocalist.

In popular culture
It appears in the 2004 video game Grand Theft Auto: San Andreas in the fictional radio station Bounce FM.

Samples of this song

"I Don't Want To Treat You Wrong" by MC Shy D (1988)
"The Questions" by Audio Two (1988)
"For the Easy Listeners" by DJ Magic Mike (1990)
"Bonita Applebum (Hootie Mix)" by A Tribe Called Quest (1990)
"Breaker 1/9" by Common (1992)
"Cramping My Style" by UGK (1992)
"I Don't Even Trip" by Totally Insane (1992)
"Solo per Te" by Articolo 31 (1993)
"Another Day" Mac Clan-Livin the Life (1993) (edited by KILLA E)
"Lips" by Dre Dog/Andre Nickatina (1993)
"Break of Dawn" by Rob Base (1994)
"Time To Get My Drank On" Thug Life (Unreleased Demo) (1994)
"Big Poppa" by The Notorious B.I.G. (1994)
"Funkdafied" by Da Brat (1994)
"Old School" by Aaliyah (1994)
"Pass The J" by DJ Hard (1994)
"The Most Beautifullest Thing in This World" by Keith Murray (1994)
"Get with You" by Phunk Addict Crew (1995)
"Super G" by MVP & The Monsta Klick (1995)
"Nika" by Lil' Vicious (1995)
"Fed Up wit the Bullshit" by Big L (1995)
"Superman" by Skee-Lo (1995)
"Za Sve Oko Mene" by Tram 11 (1999)
Witness by Shelley Gaines (2000)
"One of Those Days" by Whitney Houston (2002)
"Home of the Realest" by Mullyman and Memphis Bleek (2004)
"Luxurious" by Gwen Stefani (2004)
"Sheets" by Shy FX & T Power (2005) - drum and bass
"Summer wit Miami" by Jim Jones (2005)
"Comin' on Strong" by Tupac Shakur (2006)
"On the Hotline" by Pretty Ricky (2006)
"Cali Niggaz (Young Niggaz)" by The Game (2007)
"In Between These Sheets" by StarRJ The Feenom  (2007)
"Ignorant Shit" by Jay-Z (2007)
"Ignorant Shit Freestyle" by Lupe Fiasco (2007)
"Never Can Say Goodbye" by The Game (2008)
"Babo Regresa" by Cartel de Santa (2008)
"Ignant Shit" by Drake and Lil Wayne (2009)
"A Night Off" by Drake and Lloyd (2009)
"Westside" by Kollegah (2009)
"Who You Foolin" by Pop Rox and J Carr
"Coming on Strong" by Plies and Ron Isley
"Real Plexxx" by Lil B
"Back2Mackin" by Vistoso Bosses (2010)
"Rich Nigga Dick" by J. Stalin (2010)
"Juke Juke" by Chance The Rapper (2012)
"Another Night" by Ronald Isley (2013)
"Wrong In The Right Way" by Chris Brown and Tyga (2015)
"Pick Yourself Up" by Big K.R.I.T. (2018)
"Like That" by Doja Cat (2019)

Chart performance

Personnel
Lead vocals by Ronald Isley
Background vocals by Rudolph Isley, O'Kelly Isley, Jr. and Chris Jasper
Additional percussion by Ernie Isley
Bass guitar & additional percussion by Marvin Isley
Keyboards, synthesizers and drum machine programming by Chris Jasper

References

External links
 List of cover versions of "Between the Sheets" at SecondHandSongs.com

1983 singles
Funk ballads
The Isley Brothers songs
Songs written by Ronald Isley
Songs written by O'Kelly Isley Jr.
Songs written by Rudolph Isley
Songs written by Chris Jasper
Songs written by Ernie Isley
Songs written by Marvin Isley
1983 songs
Chaka Khan songs
Contemporary R&B ballads
Soul ballads
T-Neck Records singles
1980s ballads